is a railway station on the Sasaguri Line operated by JR Kyushu in Iizuka, Fukuoka Prefecture, Japan.

Lines
The station is sometimes depicted on maps and timetables as part of the Fukuhoku Yutaka Line, of which the Sasaguri Line is a component.

Station layout 
The station consists of two side platforms serving two tracks on a low embankment. The station building is at a higher level than the main road and accessed by a flight of steps. Access to the opposite platform is by means of a covered footbridge. Bike sheds are located at base of the steps leading to the station building.

Management of the station has been outsourced to the JR Kyushu Tetsudou Eigyou Co., a wholly owned subsidiary of JR Kyushu specialising in station services. It staffs the ticket window which is equipped with a POS machine but does not have a Midori no Madoguchi facility.

Adjacent stations

History
With the privatization of JNR on 1 April 1987, JR Kyushu took over control of the station.

Passenger statistics
In fiscal 2016, the station was used by an average of 732 passengers daily (boarding passengers only), and it ranked 200th among the busiest stations of JR Kyushu.

References

External links
Chikuzen-Daibu (JR Kyushu)

Railway stations in Fukuoka Prefecture
Railway stations in Japan opened in 1968